Kyra Davis (born August 23, 1972) is an American novelist. She is best known for her Just One Night trilogy and the Sophie Katz mystery series. In 2013 Anonymous Content optioned Davis' Just One Night trilogy with the intent to develop it into a television series.

Biography
Davis was born in Santa Clara, California, to a Jewish single mother who raised Davis with the help of family. She was named after Kira Argounova, the protagonist in Ayn Rand's novel We The Living. Her father was African-American and her mother was of Eastern European descent, giving Davis a mixed heritage. Davis attended the Fashion Institute of Design & Merchandising and Fashion Institute of Technology, during which time she met and married her first husband. Davis later attended the Golden Gate University, where she graduated with a bachelor's degree in business and humanities. In 2001 Davis filed for divorce. Davis began writing the Sophie Katz series due to the stress resulting from the divorce and published her first novel through Red Dress Ink in 2005. In 2013 Davis published the Just One Night trilogy through Simon & Schuster's digital imprint.

Davis lives in Los Angeles, California, with her son and her husband, director and screenwriter Rod Lurie, who has two children from a prior relationship. She has two step children from Rod, Paige (who has a cat) and Hunter whom she loves very much.

Critical reception
Reception to Davis's work has been positive, with "Just One Night" getting a starred review in Publishers Weekly and Lust, Loathing and a Little Lip Gloss being one of GalleyCat's "Featured Book of Color Pick of the Day". The Houston Chronicle praised Sex, Murder and a Double Latte, calling it "a terrific mystery".

So Much For My Happy Ending received positive reviews, with Boston.com saying that the book had a "sensitive, honest, engaging voice".

Bibliography

Just One Night trilogy
The Stranger (2013)
Exposed (2013)
Binding Agreement (2013)
Just One Night (2013, compilation of all three novellas)
Just One Lie 
Just One More

Pure Sin
Deceptive Innocence (2014, initially released in three parts) 
Dangerous Alliance (2014)

Sophie Katz Mysteries
Sex, Murder and a Double Latte (2005)
Passion, Betrayal And Killer Highlights (2006)
Obsession, Deceit, and Really Dark Chocolate (2007)
Lust, Loathing and a Little Lip Gloss (2009)
Vows, Vendettas and a Little Black Dress (2010)
Vanity, Vengeance And A Weekend In Vegas (2012)
Seven Swans A' Shooting (2013)

Standalone novels
So Much for My Happy Ending (2006)

Non-fiction
Perfectly Plum: Unauthorized Essays On the Life, Loves And Other Disasters of Stephanie Plum, Trenton Bounty Hunter  (2007)
Everything I Needed to Know About Being a Girl I Learned from Judy Blume

References

External links
 
 Official blog

Living people
21st-century American novelists
African-American novelists
American mystery writers
American women novelists
Golden Gate University alumni
Jewish American novelists
People from Santa Clara, California
Women mystery writers
21st-century American women writers
Novelists from California
1972 births
21st-century African-American women writers
21st-century African-American writers
21st-century American Jews
20th-century African-American people
20th-century African-American women